Tapenagá is a southern department of Chaco Province in Argentina.

The provincial subdivision has a population of about  4,000 inhabitants in an area of  6,025km², and its capital city is Charadai, which is located around 1,070 km from the Capital federal.

Settlements 
 Oetling

References

Departments of Chaco Province